The Willis Museum is a local history museum in the Market Place, Basingstoke, Hampshire, England. The building, which was the headquarters of Basingstoke Borough Council, is a Grade II listed building.

History

The building
Since the 14th century a Mote Hall was situated in Market Place, just to the east of Lloyds Bank. The present building, which was designed in the neoclassical style, was completed in 1835. The building served as a corn exchange and market hall and dances were held in the room upstairs. It was also the headquarters of the Council of the Borough of Basingstoke until the borough was abolished by the Local Government Act 1972 in 1974. It then served as the headquarters of the enlarged District of Basingstoke until the Civic Offices opened nearby in 1981. It has been home to the Willis Museum since 1984.

The museum
The museum was originally housed in the old (now demolished) Mechanics' Institute building in New Road. It was founded by the local clockmaker, George W. Willis, as the Basingstoke Museum in 1931. Renamed after the founder in 1956, the Willis Museum was expanded to cover the town and surrounding area's history, from the Upper Cretaceous Age through to the development experienced during the 1960s and 1970s. It moved to the Town Hall in 1984. As well as funding from visitor donations, the Willis Museum receives grant funding from Basingstoke and Deane Borough Council.

Exhibitions 
Displays covers local history, including remains of an ancient human known as "Basingstoke Man" and what is rumoured to be the world’s oldest wedding cake. In 2014, the museum faced criticism after some medieval coins, donated by a local treasure hunter, were removed from display.

In January 2018 the museum faced criticism after specialist job roles were cut as part of a restructure of the wider Hampshire Cultural Trust service.

The museum is home to the Sainsbury Gallery, which hosts temporary exhibitions. The gallery was added to the museum in 2008 with funding by the Linbury Trust, founded by Lord Sainsbury. Previous exhibitions in the Sainsbury Gallery have included:
 May The Toys Be With You
 Turner and the Sun
 Alice in Wonderland

Jane Austen statue 
Situated outside the museum is a statue of Jane Austen. The life-sized bronze figure was created by sculptor Adam Roud as part of a series of events marking the 200th anniversary of the writer's death. It is considered to be the first of Austen in the world. The events were credited with boosting the previously falling number of visitors to the museum, though it is unknown for how long or successfully this effect will last.

The location was chosen as it is speculated to be the same square Austen would have visited to go shopping or to dance at the assembly rooms nearby. The statue was unveiled at a public ceremony attended by civic figures as well as Austen fans (or "Janeites") in Regency costume. Jane Austen spent the first 25 years of her life in nearby Steventon, where her father was vicar. Roud claimed that the statue represents Austen as a "daughter and a sister" as she walked through the town.

References

External links 
 Friends of the Willis

Museums in Hampshire
City and town halls in Hampshire
Grade II listed buildings in Hampshire
Basingstoke
Government buildings completed in 1835